The 329th Combat Crew Training Squadron is an inactive United States Air Force unit. It was last assigned to the 93d Operations Group at Castle Air Force Base, California, where it was responsible for the training of Boeing B-52 Stratofortress aircrews until inactivating on 1 July 1994.

The squadron was first activated as the 329th Bombardment Squadron in 1942 and trained with Consolidated B-24 Liberator heavy bombers.  During training, it also flew antisubmarine patrols over the Gulf of Mexico.  It was one of the first bomber units to deploy to the European Theater of Operations, to participate in the strategic bombing campaign against Germany.  In 1942 and 1943, its air echelon moved to reinforce the bomber force in the Mediterranean Theater of Operations, where it earned a Distinguished Unit Citation for its participation in Operation Tidal Wave.  Following V-E Day, the squadron returned to the United States to retrain as a Boeing B-29 Superfortress unit.

In 1946, the squadron moved to Castle Field, which was to be its home for the rest of its existence.  It trained for bomber operations and also conducted the flying phase of B-52 aircrew training until inactivating in 1971.  It was reactivated at Castle in the training mission in 1986 as the 329th Strategic Bomber Training Squadron.

History

World War II

Established in early 1942 initially as a Consolidated B-24 Liberator reconnaissance squadron, flying antisubmarine patrols. Later being redesignated as a heavy bomb group; trained under Third Air Force in Florida. Completed training in late 1942; deploying to European Theater of Operations as one of the initial heavy bomber squadrons assigned to VIII Bomber Command in England, September 1942.

Engaged in long-ranger strategic bombardment operations over Occupied Europe. Deployed to IX Bomber Command in Egypt in December 1942; operating from airfields in Libya and Tunisia. Raided enemy military and industrial targets in Italy and in the southern Balkans, including the Nazi-controlled oilfields at Polesti, Romania receiving a Distinguished Unit Citation for its gallantry in that raid. Also flew tactical bombing raids against Afrika Korps defensive positions in Tunisia; supporting British Eighth Army forces in their advance to Tunis, in September and October 1943.

Returned to England with disestablishment of IX Bomber Command in North Africa. From England, resumed long-range strategic bombardment raids on Occupied Europe and Nazi Germany, attacking enemy military and industrial targets as part of the United States' air offensive. The squadron was one of the most highly decorated units in the Eighth Air Force, continuing offensive attacks until the German capitulation in May 1945.

Post war bomber operations
Having returned to the United States in June 1945; being re-manned and re-equipped with Boeing B-29 Superfortress heavy bombers. Trained for deployment to the Central Pacific Area to carry out very long range strategic bombing raids over Japan. Japanese capitulation in August canceled plans for deployment, instead became Continental Air Command (later Strategic Air Command) B-29 squadron.

Began upgrading to the new Boeing B-50 Superfortress, an advanced version of the B-29 in 1950. The B-50 gave the unit the capability to carry heavy loads of conventional weapons faster and farther as well as being designed for atomic bomb missions if necessary. By 1951, the emergence of the Soviet MiG-15 interceptor in the skies of North Korea signaled the end of the propeller-driven B-50 as a first-line strategic bomber. Received Boeing B-47 Stratojet jet bombers in 1954, and in 1955 began receiving early model of the Boeing B-52 Stratofortress. The squadron ceased operations on 14 September 1971 and inactivated at the end of the month.

Bomber crew training
Reactivated as a B-52 combat crew training squadron in 1986; inactivated in 1994 after the end of the Cold War and the reduction of the B-52 fleet.

Lineage
 Constituted 329th Bombardment Squadron (Heavy) on 28 January 1942
 Activated on 1 March 1942
 Redesignated: 329th Bombardment Squadron, Heavy on 20 August 1943
 Redesignated: 329th Bombardment Squadron, Very Heavy on 23 May 1945
 Redesignated: 329th Bombardment Squadron, Medium on 28 May 1948
 Redesignated: 329th Bombardment Squadron, Heavy on 1 February 1955
 Inactivated on 30 September 1971
 Redesignated 329th Strategic Bombardment Training Squadron c. 12 February 1986
 Activated on 1 July 1986
 Redesignated 329th Combat Crew Training Squadron c. 1 July 1987
 Inactivated on 1 July 1994

Assignments
 93d Bombardment Group, 1 March 1942 (attached to 93d Bombardment Wing after 10 February 1951)
 93d Bombardment Wing, 16 June 1952 – 30 September 1971
 93d Bombardment Wing, 1 July 1986
 93d Operations Group, 1 September 1991 – 1 July 1994

Stations

Barksdale Field, Louisiana, 1 March 194
Page Field, Florida, 18 May - 13 August 1942
RAF Alconbury (AAF-102), England, 7 September 1942
RAF Hardwick (AAF-104), England, c. 6 December 1942 – 15 June 1945
 Air echelon operated from: Tafaraoui Airfield, Algeria, 7 – 15 December 1942, RAF Gambut, Libya, 16 December 1942 - 25 February 1943, Bengasi Airport, Libya, 27 June - 25 August 1943. Oudna Airfield, Tunisia, 18 September - 3 October 1943

Sioux Falls Army Air Field, South Dakota, 26 June-26 July 1945
Pratt Army Air Field, Kansas, 20 August 1945
Clovis Army Air Field, New Mexico, 13 December 1945
Castle Field (later Castle Air Force Base), California, 21 June 1946 – 30 September 1971
 Castle Air Force Base, California, 1 July 1986 – 1 July 1994

Aircraft
 Consolidated B-24 Liberator, 1942–1945
 Boeing B-29 Superfortress, 1945–1949
 Boeing B-50 Superfortress, 1949–1954
 Boeing B-47 Stratojet, 1954–1955
 Boeing B-52 Stratofortress, 1955–197, 1986–1994

See also

 List of B-52 Units of the United States Air Force

References

Notes
 Explanatory notes

 Citations

Bibliography

External links

 The 93rd Bombardment Group Museum, Station 104, Hardwick. A small museum on the actual airfield site in Nissen (Quonset) and brick built huts.

0329